Walter Gordon Asbil (born 3 October 1932) is a retired Canadian Anglican bishop.

Life and vocation
Asbil was born in 1932. He was educated at McGill University in Montreal, Quebec. Ordained in 1957, his first ministry position was at Aylwin River Desert. He held incumbencies at South Shore, Montreal, St Stephen's Montreal, St George's Sainte-Anne-de-Bellevue, Quebec, and St George's in St Catharines, Ontario.

From 1986 to 1990, he was Dean of  Christ Church Cathedral in Ottawa, after which he became coadjutor bishop of the Anglican Diocese of Niagara and then its diocesan bishop in 1991. He retired in 1997.

His son, Andrew Asbil, became the Dean of Toronto in 2016. On June 9, 2018, it was announced that Andrew Asbil was elected as Coadjutor Bishop of Toronto and would become the 12th Bishop of Toronto after the retirement of Archbishop Colin Johnson at the end of 2018.

References and notes

1932 births
McGill University alumni
Deans of Ottawa
Anglican bishops of Niagara
20th-century Anglican Church of Canada bishops
Living people